Abdurrahim Akça (born 2 February 1983), better known by his stage name Eypio, is a Turkish rapper, songwriter and musician.

Early life and career 
Eypio was born to an Afghan Turkmen migrant family. He has been active in music industry since 2002, founded his own studio in June 2009. Eypio records some of his songs in his own studio but some of his works have been produced by other production companies. His studio provides information on rap music and rap for new rappers. In 2013, he changed his stage name from A.P.O. to Eypio. In 2013, his song "Ayrım Yok" was made into a music video. In 2014, new clips were mafe for his songs "Kral Çıplak" and "Ay Kızım" form the album Beton Duvar. On 24 December 2015, the music video of his song with Burak King titled "Günah Benim" was released on YouTube, a video which has more than 230 million views. He later began working on his new album. On 17 June 2016, together with Burak King, he  published a piece for the national team titled "Ay Bizim Yıldız Bizim". On 1 July 2016, his album Günah Benim was released.

Discography

Albums 
2005 - A.P.O - (EP)
2006 - Rap Fabriek - (1st Studio album)
2007 - Hırsız Var - (2nd Studio album)
2008 - Apollo - (3rd Studio album)
2011 - AbduRhyme - (4th Studio album)
2012 - 16:34 - (5th Studio album)
2014 - Beton Duvar - (6th Studio album)
2016 - Günah Benim - (7th Studio album)
2020 - Urgan - (8th studio album)

Music videos 
2013 - Ayrım Yok
2014 - Kral Çıplak
2015 - Ay Kızım
2015 - Günah Benim
2018 - Bura Anadolu (Direniş Karatay Film Music)
2018 - Reset 
2018 - Kaşık (Kafalar Karışık Film Music)
2019 - Vur Vur
2019 - Umudum Kalmadı
2019 - Naim
2020 - Katliam 4
2020 - Urgan
2021 - Seni Öptüğüm Sokak 
2021 - Bizim Çocuklar 
2022 - Yan 
2022 - Anakonda 
2022 - Ay Kızım 
2022 - Git Dedim 
2022 - Can't Touch This

Awards and nominations

References 

1983 births
People from Kabul
Turkish lyricists
Living people
21st-century Turkish singers
21st-century Turkish male singers
Afghan Turkmen people
Turkish people of Afghan descent